The Karrangpurru are an Aboriginal Australian people of the Northern Territory. They suffered severe population loss very early on in the period of colonial expropriations of their land.

Country
The Karrangpurru lived to the north of the Bilinara.

History of contact
Karrangpurru lands were subsumed into the Victoria River Downs Station when it was established in 1883. A combination of massacres and the impact of diseases introduced by whites penetrating their country effectively decimated the population. The descendants of the survivors of the colonial period live in the community of Yarralin and town of Katherine.

Language
Nothing is known of their language, Karranga, since its many of its speakers were wiped out without any items from it being recorded.

References

Sources

Aboriginal peoples of the Northern Territory